"Yoo Doo Right" is a song on Can's 1969 debut album, Monster Movie, which had been edited down from a six-hour improvisation to a mere twenty minutes. The song features a pounding, tribal-influenced rhythm section throughout, along with singer Malcolm Mooney repeatedly reading excerpts from a love letter in an almost mantra-like manner.

Can continued to play the song after Mooney's departure, as heard on the Can Live album. It has been covered in abbreviated form by the Geraldine Fibbers, Thin White Rope, Masaki Batoh, Susheela Raman, Jonathan Segel, The Wendys and others. In 2001, shortly after the death of Can's guitarist Michael Karoli, a group of musicians associated with the Austrian composer Karlheinz Essl performed this song in several hour-long concerts in his memory.

The song was remixed by 3p for the double remix compilation Sacrilege in 1997, reduced to a three-minute, verse-chorus-bridge pop piece.

Thin White Rope covered the song on the 1990 album Sack Full of Silver.

The first track on the Primal Scream album Screamadelica, "Movin' on Up", features the line "I was blind, now I can see, you made a believer outta me" which also appears in the lyrics of "Yoo Doo Right".

References

External links

 Yoo Doo Right: music performance in memory of Michael Karoli (1948-2001) with video
 Lyrics of Yoo Doo Right

1969 songs
Can (band) songs